Arthur von Abramson (born 3 March 1854) was an Imperial Russian civil engineer.

He was born to a Jewish family in Odessa, and was educated at the city's gymnasium. He studied mathematics at the University of Odessa, but left to take a course in civil engineering at the Zurich Polytechnikum, from which he was graduated in 1876. Returning to Russia in 1879, von Abramson passed the state examination at the Russian Imperial Institute of Roads and Communications, and was appointed one of the directors of the Russian state railway at Kiev. He devised, built, and managed the sewer system of Kiev, and constructed the street-railroad of that city. In 1881 he founded and became editor-in-chief of a technical monthly, Inzhener ('The Engineer'). He was appointed president of the local sewer company and director of the Kiev city railroad.

Publications
  Published in English as

References
 

1854 births
Year of death unknown
ETH Zurich alumni
Civil engineers from the Russian Empire
Editors from the Russian Empire
Odesa Jews
Print editors
Railway civil engineers
People from the Russian Empire in rail transport